The 2022–23 season is the 129th in the history of Genoa C.F.C. and their first season back in the second division since 2007. The club will participate in Serie B and Coppa Italia.

Players

Out on loan

Transfers

Pre-season and friendlies

Competitions

Overall record

Serie B

League table

Results summary

Results by round

Matches 
The league fixtures were announced on 15 July 2022.

Coppa Italia

References 

Genoa C.F.C. seasons
Genoa